The House of McDonnell is a traditional Irish pub in Ballycastle, County Antrim, Northern Ireland.

Established in 1744, the pub is noted for the quality of the traditional Irish pub interior (Grade A listed), which has remained largely unchanged over the years (the last major refurbishment taking place in the mid-19th century). The pub has been described by CAMRA as "a great classic among Irish pubs".

History
Established in 1744. The House of McDonnell was first established as a  spirit grocery and stabling facility to provide passing travelers with refreshment and rest. To this end the pub was built with complete stabling facilities for both horses and coaches. The stabling operation was so large that it occupied fully 3/4 of the ground upon which the pub now stands. As the horse is no longer the primary means of transportation in Ireland, the stable blocks, although still standing, are now redundant.

The pub itself occupies the ground floor of its original building and the present interior dates from around 1870. It is one of the few pubs in Ireland to retain its original traditional interior, and both the interior and exterior of the bar are now among the few pubs in Ireland listed on the National Inventory of Historic Pub Interiors.

From the end of the nineteenth century, the pub was known locally as "The Store", a name which was in use until the 1960s, when the glass window above the front door bearing the name was accidentally broken. "The Store" was used because at this time the pub was a "Spirit grocery", a type of business unique to Ireland which supplied, as the name suggests, both spirits and groceries. The licence of a "Spirit-Grocer" was that of a "wine, tea and spirit merchant".

At its founding, the pub was leased by Archibald McDonnell, who ran it until his death. The lease remained in the family until 1826,  and the bar was subsequently purchased by the descendants of Archibald McDonnell. The bar was subsequently handed down from generation to generation until the present proprietor, Tom O'Neill, took over from his aunt, Mary McDonnell, in 1979. The pub has thus remained in the hands of the same family in the 240 years since it was established, and this continuity has been suggested as the reason why the pub retains many structural and design characteristics which have been lost in so many other traditional Irish pubs.

Interior
The pub's collection of traditional Irish bar mirrors (advertising various Irish Whiskey brands) is among the finest in the world.

Music venue
The House of McDonnell is also recognised as one of Ireland's best traditional Irish music venues and traditional music sessions are held weekly. The pub has been featured in many television and film productions.

References

External links

Pubs in County Antrim